Assan Jana Mall-o Mall (Punjabi: اساں جانا مال و مال) is the fifth pop album of Pakistani singer Abrar-ul-Haq. It was released on February 21, 2002. In this album, Abrar introduced some spiritual songs such as "Rang Rang".

Track listing
"Charian Da Dil Cheerdee (Maza Zindagi Ka)" 
"Dilbar" 
"Jagga"   
"Assan Jana Malo"-Mal   
"Badam Rangee"   
"Preeto"   
"Punjabi Touch"   
"Rang Rang"   
"Rondeeyan"   
"Sar Utha Kar"
"Suk Diya Niddarain"

External links 
 Abrar-ul-Haq's Official Website

2002 albums
Abrar-ul-Haq albums